Bogorodskoye is a rural locality (a selo) and the administrative center of Bogorodskoye Rural Settlement, Ust-Kubinsky  District, Vologda Oblast, Russia. The population was 331 as of 2002. There are 10 streets.

Geography 
Bogorodskoye is located 51 km northwest of Ustye (the district's administrative centre) by road. Kuznetsovo is the nearest rural locality.

References 

Rural localities in Ust-Kubinsky District